Neti (Sanskrit:  नेती netī) is an important part of Shatkarma (sometimes known as Shatkriya), the Hindu yogic system of body cleansing techniques. It can have universal application, irrespective of their religion. It is intended mainly to clean the air passageways in the head. Both the Hatha Yoga Pradipika and other sources usually attribute to Neti many beneficial effects that range from profound physiological ones on the body, mind and personality to even clairvoyance. The two main variants are jala neti (जलनेति) using water and the more advanced sutra neti (सूत्रनेति) using string.

Jala neti

For this technique, sterilized and lukewarm isotonic salt water is poured into one nostril, so that it leaves through the other. The procedure is then repeated on the other side, and the nose is dried by bending forward and by rapid breathing.

It is also possible to sniff the water in so that it runs into the mouth, and to spit it out. In a more advanced reverse variant, the water is taken in through the mouth and snorted out of the nose.

Sutra neti
In sutra neti, a length of wet string or thin surgical tubing is carefully and gently inserted through the nose and into the mouth.  The end is then pulled out of the mouth and while holding both ends at once the string is alternately pulled in and out of the nose and sinuses.  It is used to clear the nose and also to remove nasal polyps.

Sutra neti is an advanced form of yogic nasal cleansing and requires an experienced teacher.  Sensations of gagging, nausea, and weakness may occur.  In case of persistent blockage after jala neti, sutra neti should only be performed after a medical consultation.

Sutra neti is a nasal cleansing yoga exercise wherein the nasal area and outer respiratory regions are decongested with the help of soft thread. Initially, the soft thread is inserted through one nostril and tries to bring out through the mouth. The same process should be repeated with another nostril. After having mastery of the process, it can be inserted through one nostril and try to make it out through another nostril. One thing should be kept in mind is that it should always be practiced under the supervision of a yoga expert.

For the practice of sutra neti, it is better to use cotton thread, which should be carefully twisted. Before practicing, it should be carefully checked for knots or dust particles as they can harm the soft nasal region and also cause bleeding. Before using the thread, it should be soaked properly in water. A thin rubber catheter can also be used in place of thread. Cotton thread can be used having 4 mm width and being around 36 cm long (long enough to pass down the nose and reach out through the mouth). For beginning users a thin rubber catheter is preferred as it’s more lubricated compared to a cotton thread, so it easily slides more through nasal passages. While using cotton thread for Sutra neti, make sure to lubricate it using beeswax (or any other agent) otherwise it can produce a sense of nausea.

Some children are diagnosed with nasal allergies as early as age 2 and could use nasal rinsing devices at that time (only about Jal Neti Kriya) if a pediatrician recommends it, however very young children might not tolerate the procedure.  Whether for a child or adult, talk to your health care provider to determine whether nasal rinsing will be safe or effective for your condition.

Notes

Further reading
 
 
 

Hygiene
Kriyas
Shatkarmas